Barracão is a municipality in the state of Rio Grande do Sul, Brazil.

The municipality contains the  Espigão Alto State Park created in 1949.

See also
List of municipalities in Rio Grande do Sul

References

Municipalities in Rio Grande do Sul